(1,2,5,6-Tetrahydropyridin-4-yl)methylphosphinic acid (TPMPA) is a GABA antagonist selective for the GABA-ρ (previously known as GABA) subtype.

References

Phosphinic acids
Tetrahydropyridines
GABAA-rho receptor antagonists